Wiren Dale Becker, who works for IBM, was named a Fellow of the Institute of Electrical and Electronics Engineers (IEEE) in 2015 for contributions to power distribution and signal integrity in high-speed interconnects for computing systems.

See also
Sukumar Brahma
Johan H. Enslin

References

External links

20th-century births
Living people
IBM employees
Fellow Members of the IEEE
21st-century American engineers
Year of birth missing (living people)
Place of birth missing (living people)
American electrical engineers